Diwanjimoola Grand Prix is a 2018 Indian Malayalam-language sports comedy film directed by Anil Radhakrishnan Menon. The screenplay was co-written by Menon and former Kozhikode District Collector Prasanth Nair, fondly known as Collector Bro while dialogues are written by Riyas Marath. The film features Kunchacko Boban, Nyla Usha, Nedumudi Venu, Siddique, Vinayakan, and Sudheer Karamana. 
The film was released on theaters on 5 January 2018.

Plot
A newly appointed district collector of Thrissur takes up the task of cleaning up the city of its shortcomings and rallying people for a noble cause, by bringing back a bike race at the Diwanjimoola race track after three decades. The race serves as a platform to settle old scores and unearth new heroes for the residents of Diwanjimoola.

Cast

 Kunchacko Boban as Sajan Joseph IAS (Reprise name from Kasthooriman)
 Nyla Usha as Effy mol
 Siddique as Jithendran
Nirmal Palazhi as Sivan
 Shaheen Siddique as Young Jithendran
 Sijoy Varghese as Christo
 Rahul Rajasekharan as Saththan
 Ketaki Narayan as Peeli Mol
 Rajeev rajan as Elluminungi
 Jithin Paramel as Para
 Ravi menon as Alavi
 Nedumudi Venu as Davisettan
 Vinayakan as Vareedh
 Rajeev Pillai as Gunman PP Shibu
 Assim Jamal as CA Kunjahammad
 Manikandan Pattambi as Anirudhan
 Hareesh Kanaran as Ganeshan
 Abraham Koshy as Accomplice
 Ashokan as Rishi (Reprise name from Thoovanathumbikal)
 Sudheer Karamana as Leaf Vasu (From Sapthamashree Thaskaraha)
 Tini Tom as Subhran (From Pranchiyettan and the Saint)
 Umar payyanur as taxi driver

Production 

Menon co-writes the film with Prashant M. Nair, the former Kozhikode district collector. Principal photography commenced on 12 April 2017 in Thrissur, Kerala. The film was shot in different locations in and around Thrissur town. Some parts were shot in Ernakulam. Many of the actors were selected after an extensive audition. The film marks the debut of many of these actors. A motion poster of the film was released on 18 Oct 2017 Diwali day.
Sudheer Karamana reprises the role of Leaf Vasu from the director's earlier film Sapthamashree Thaskaraha, Ashokan as Rishi of Padmarajan's Thoovanathumbikal and Tini Tom as Subramanian of Ranjith's Pranchiyettan & the Saint. The film score and songs were composed by Gopi Sundar.

Critical reception
Rating the film , Meenakshy Menon of Cinema Express stated, "Diwanjimoola has the right focus, steady flow and when the film ends, it feels complete and fills us with positivity." Sanjith Sasidharan of The Times of India rated the film  said that "The film is a lighter and the satire has its heart in right place – discussing issues of false promises by politicians, youth without purpose, neglecting the travails of the voiceless and significance of culture. However, it tries to highlight too much without really thrusting on any. That would have packed some power to the film". Filmibeat rated  and stated: "the film is definitely a watchable one for its characters, performances and the light humor which is there in the film in abundance".

Soundtrack 
The background score and songs have been composed by Gopi Sunder. The lyrics have been written by Harinarayanan.

References

External links
 

2018 films
2010s Malayalam-language films
Films shot in Thrissur
Films shot in Kochi